Sonkovo is an urban locality (an urban-type settlement) and the administrative center of Sonkovsky District of Tver Oblast, Russia. Population:

History
Founded by the Russian Greek Orthodox Inkeriköt (Izhorians) in the 17th century and called Savelionkylä (or Savelankylä), the village later changed its name to Savelino due to its proximity to the village of Savelikha, which was built in 1870 during the construction and expansion of the private Rybinsk-Bologoye Railway. The railway merged with the narrow gauge (1067 mm) Novgorod Railway and broad gauge (1829 mm) Tsarskoye Selo Railway in 1895 to form a new private railway company, which then built two branch lines from Savelino — one to Kashin and the other one to Krasny Kholm in 1898 and 1899 respectively. During the Soviet era, following the construction of new railway lines and a bridge over the Volga River, Sonkovo became a major railway station.

In 1903, the settlement was renamed Sonkovo to avoid possible confusion and a main locomotive depot constructed near the station. Sonkovo received urban-type settlement status to in 1928.  Currently, the railway line east of Sonkovo–Rybinsk–Yaroslavl is part of the Russia's Northern Railway Administration, while the remainder of the railway lines in Tver Oblast belong to the Oktyabrsk (October) Railway Administration.

Prior to the 1917 October Revolution, about one third of the Sonkovo's inhabitants were so-called Tver Karelians who spoke their own dialect of Karelian (Karielan: kielt).

The majority of the dwellings in Sonkovo are wooden although there are many two and three story brick and concrete buildings as well as numerous pre-World War II structures. The center of the settlement is located next to the train station and its main street, Lenina Avenue, connects to Bezhetsk via the R-85 highway. Sonkovo is divided in two by the Rybinsk–Bologoye railway line. There are no significant landmarks in the settlement.

Economy

Industry
The industrial enterprises in the district are located in Sonkovo and serve the railway station. Additionally, there is a milk production plant.

Transportation

Two railways cross in Sonkovo, which is thus an important railway junction. One, running from south to north, connects Moscow with Mga via Krasny Kholm and Pestovo. Another one, running east to west, connects Rybinsk with Bologoye.

Sonkovo is connected by road with Bezhetsk, where it has access to the roads running to Tver and Vesyegonsk. There are also local roads, with the bus traffic originating from Sonkovo.

References

Notes

Sources

Urban-type settlements in Tver Oblast
Kashinsky Uyezd